Prosopon (from   prósōpon; plural: πρόσωπα prósōpa) is a theological term used in Christian theology as designation for the concept of a divine person. The term has a particular significance in Christian Triadology (study of the Trinity), and also in Christology.

In English language, the form prosopon is used mainly in scholarly works, related to theology, philosophy or history of religion, while it is also commonly translated as person, both in scholarly or non-scholarly writings. The term prosopon should not be confused with the term hypostasis, which is related to similar theological concepts, but differs in meaning.

The Latin term for prosopon, traditionally used in Western Christianity, and from which the English term person is derived, is persona.

Overview
In Ancient Greek language, term prosopon originally designated one's "face" or "mask". In that sense, it was used in Greek theatre, since actors wore specific masks on stage, in order to reveal their character and emotional state to the audience. 

The term prosopon had an important role in the development of theological terminology related to the Holy Trinity, and Jesus Christ. It was the subject of many theological debates and disputes, particularly through early centuries of Christian history.

The term prosopon is most commonly used for the self-manifestation of an individual hypostasis. Prosopon is the form in which hypostasis appears. Every hypostasis has its own prosopon: face or countenance. It gives expression to the reality of the hypostasis with its powers and characteristics. 

Paul the Apostle uses the term when speaking of his direct apprehension in the heart of the face (prosopon) of Christ.

Prosopon in Christian Triadology

In Christian Triadology (study of the Holy Trinity) three specific theological concepts have emerged throughout history, in reference to number and mutual relations of divine persons: 

 monoprosopic concept advocates that God has only one person;
 dyoprosopic concept advocates that God has two persons (Father and Son);
 triprosopic concept advocates that God has three persons (Father, Son and the Holy Spirit).

The most notable example of monoprosopic views is represented in ancient Sabellianism and its later variants, including teachings of some modern Christian denominations, like those of Monoprosopic Pentecostalism.

Prosopon in Christology
Within Christology, two specific theological concepts have emerged throughout history, in reference to the Person of Christ: 
 monoprosopic concept (in Christology) advocates that Christ has only one person;
 dyoprosopic concept (in Christology) advocates that Christ has two persons (divine and human).

During the first half of the 5th century, some Antiochene theologians, including Theodore of Mopsuestia, and his disciple Nestorius, questioned the concept of hypostatic union of the two natures (divine and human) of Jesus Christ, but accepted a more loosely defined concept of the prosopic union. Since their views on hypostatic union were seen as controversial, additional questions arose regarding their teachings on the prosopic union. 

Theodore believed that incarnation of Jesus represents an indwelling of God, that is different from the indwelling experienced by the Old Testament prophets, or New Testament apostles. Jesus was viewed as a human being who shared the divine sonship of the Logos; the Logos united itself to Jesus from the moment of Jesus' conception. After the resurrection, the human Jesus and the Logos reveal that they have always been one prosopon.

Theodore addresses the prosopic union in applying prosopon to Christ the Logos. He accounts for two expressions of Christ – human and divine. Yet, he does not mean Christ achieved a unity of the two expressions through the formation of a third prosopon, but that one prosopon is produced by the Logos giving his own countenance to the assured man. He interprets the unity of God and man in Christ along the lines of the body-soul unity. Prosopon plays a special part in his interpretation of Christ. He rejected the Hypostasis concept – believing it to be a contradiction of Christ’s true nature. He espoused that, in Christ, both body and soul had to be assumed. Christ assumed a soul and by the grace of God brought it to immutability and to a full dominion over the sufferings of the body.

Nestorius furthered Theodore’s views on the prosopic union, claiming that prosopon is the "appearance" of the ousia (essence), and stating: "the prosopon makes known the ousia". On several instances, he emphasized the relation of each of the two natures (divine and human) with their respective appearances, using the term prosopon both in plural forms, and also as a singular designation for the prosopic union. Such terminological complexities and inconsistencies proved to be challenging not only for his contemporary critiques or followers, but also for later commentators and scholars.

The very suggestion of prosopic duality was challenging enough to cause heated debates among Christian theologians in the first half of the 5th century, resulting in official condemnation of such views. The Third Ecumenical Council (431) affirmed the teaching of "One Person" of Jesus Christ, condemning all other teachings. The Fourth Ecumenical Council (451) reaffirmed the notion of One Person of Jesus Christ, formulating the famous Chalcedonian Definition with its "monoprosopic" (having one person) clauses, and in the same time explicitly denying the validity of "dyoprosopic" (having two persons) views.

See also 
 Person of Christ
 Nestorianism

References

Sources 

 
 
 
 
 
 
 
 
 
 
 
 
 
 
  
  
 
 
 
 
 
 
 
 
 
 
 
 

Christian philosophy
Christology
Trinitarianism
Nature of Jesus Christ
Personhood
New Testament Greek words and phrases